Perfect Square is a 2004 concert film of the alternative rock band R.E.M., filmed on July 19, 2003, at the Bowling Green in Wiesbaden, Germany. It was released by Warner Reprise Video on March 9, 2004.

The concert features a performance of the song "Country Feedback", which Michael Stipe opens by declaring it his "favorite song". The rendition features appended lyrics from another song, Reveal'''s "Chorus and the Ring", and a guitar solo by Peter Buck, neither of which are in the original. The performance (in audio form) also found its way onto the limited edition issue of the In Time compilation, which was released a few months after the Wiesbaden concert.

Other concert highlights include the appearance of two then-new songs, "Bad Day" (Also originally known as PSA when first written in the early 1980s) and "Animal", and the re-emergence of the long-lost song "Permanent Vacation". "Permanent Vacation" dates back to 1980, years before their first album, while "Bad Day" dates back to 1985.

Included on the DVD release is a bonus documentary, A Stirling Performance'', chronicling the band's three-night stand at Stirling Castle in Scotland in July 1999. The documentary demonstrates the effect the concerts had on Stirling and its residents. It was released in 2000.

Audio
Dolby Digital Stereo
Dolby Digital 5.1

Track listing
All songs written by Bill Berry, Peter Buck, Mike Mills and Michael Stipe except as indicated.
"Begin the Begin" – 4:04
"What's the Frequency, Kenneth?" – 4:12
"Maps and Legends" – 3:28
"Drive" – 4:44
"Animal" (Buck, Mills, Stipe) – 4:22
"Daysleeper" (Buck, Mills, Stipe) – 3:46
"The Great Beyond" (Buck, Mills, Stipe) – 4:17
"Bad Day" – 4:24
"The One I Love" – 3:22
"All the Way to Reno (You're Gonna Be a Star)" (Buck, Mills, Stipe) – 5:00
"Orange Crush" – 3:59
"Losing My Religion" – 4:45
"At My Most Beautiful" (Buck, Mills, Stipe) – 3:37
"Electrolite" – 4:28
"She Just Wants to Be" (Buck, Mills, Stipe) – 5:58
"Walk Unafraid" (Buck, Mills, Stipe)  – 5:16
"Man on the Moon" – 5:57
"Everybody Hurts" – 6:26
"So Fast, So Numb" – 4:24
"Country Feedback" – 6:11
"Permanent Vacation" – 2:52
"Imitation of Life" (Buck, Mills, Stipe) – 3:55
"It's the End of the World as We Know It (And I Feel Fine)" – 5:55

Personnel
R.E.M.
Peter Buck – guitar, bass guitar, banjo, mandolin
Mike Mills – bass guitar, backing vocals, piano
Michael Stipe – lead vocals

Auxiliary musicians
Scott McCaughey – guitar, keyboard, vocals
Bill Rieflin – drums, percussion
Ken Stringfellow – keyboard, banjo, bass guitar, vocals

Certifications

References

External links

A promo for A Stirling Performance by Stylorouge
A behind-the-scenes story

2004 video albums
Live video albums
R.E.M. live albums
R.E.M. video albums
2004 live albums
Concert films
Rockumentaries
2004 films
Warner Records video albums
Warner Records live albums